Kandarr is a surname. Notable people with the surname include:

Jana Kandarr (born 1976), German tennis player
Petra Kandarr (1950–2017), East German sprinter